Gold: The Best of Minnie Riperton is a 1993 greatest hits album by American singer Minnie Riperton, released by Capitol Records.  The hits album features many of Riperton's popular hits, "Memory Lane", "Perfect Angel", "Inside My Love", and the No. 1 pop hit "Lovin' You".

Also, included is her final single "Here We Go" a duet with Peabo Bryson, from the album Love Lives Forever and "Light My Fire" a duet with José Feliciano.

Track listing

Credits
Producer – Richard Rudolph, Minnie Riperton, Stevie Wonder, Stewart Levine

References

External links
The Best of Minnie Riperton (CD) Album. Discogs

1993 compilation albums
Capitol Records compilation albums
Minnie Riperton compilation albums
Albums produced by Johnny Pate
Albums produced by Stevie Wonder
Albums produced by Stewart Levine
Compilation albums published posthumously